Jeffrey Marks (born October 8, 1960) is an American author.

Career 

Marks is best known for the series of literary criticisms he has written on American mystery authors of the middle twentieth century. His first work, Who Was That Lady? Craig Rice; Queen of the Screwball Mystery, was nominated for every major mystery award including the Edgar, the Agatha, the Anthony and the Macavity.

Marks' next work was Atomic Renaissance: Women Mystery Writers of the 1940s/1950s, which again was nominated for an Agatha.

Marks then wrote Intent to Sell: Marketing the Genre Novel. He became the moderator of Murder Must Advertise, a website and email group that discusses the best ways to market genre fiction in a changing marketplace.

His next work, Anthony Boucher: A Biobibliography, won an Anthony Award in 2009 for Best Biographical/Critical work.

He has completed a biography of mystery writer Erle Stanley Gardner, the author who created Perry Mason among other characters and has published a monograph on the pulp fiction works of Gardner, entitled Pulp Icons. 

Marks is also a contributing editor to Mystery Scene Magazine and was the director of development for the mystery book publisher Crippen & Landru, taking over the role of publisher in 2018 from Douglas G. Greene.

Bibliography 

 "Who Was That Lady? Craig Rice: Queen of the Screwball Mystery"
 "Atomic Renaissance: Women Mystery Writers of the 1940s/1950s'
 "Intent to Sell: Marketing the Genre Novel"
 "Anthony Boucher: A Biobibliography"

Notes

1960 births
Living people
American male writers
Anthony Award winners